CIPCO may refer to:

Central Iowa Power Cooperative
Caspian International Petroleum Company